Naxal is a 2015 Indian Bengali-language drama film directed by Debaditya Bandyopadhyay, starring Mithun Chakraborty and Dhritiman Chatterjee in pivotal roles.

The backdrop of the film is the Naxal Amol or Naxal Period. It was a period in the history of the state of West Bengal that began with the infiltration of the ideas of the socialist movements in the western world (especially Latin America) into the psyche of many Bengali youths. Mithun Chakraborty plays the lead role in this film as a Naxalite.

Plot
The story opens on the 21st day of May 1971 with the escaping of a few Naxalite youths. The most prominent among them is Anirban Sen. On that day, one of them named Samar dies while Anirban and their leader SankarDa go absconding.

After nearly 42 years one fine morning a FAX arrives at the Kolkata Metro Railways Headquarters. It says that today Anirban will commit suicide under the last Metro. Questions regarding his identity and demands start emerging as the news has taken centre stage in the city. This news shake the entire city from Kolkata Police Headquarters (Lalbazar) to the news channels, while Anirban rattles the administration with one FAX after the other. On the other hand, Siddhartha Chowdhury, CEO of the number-one Bengali News Channel engages himself in using this incident to boost his channel's TRP. Shubhankar, a journalist with Siddhartha's channel, while searching for Anirban, discovers that one of those persons who went missing on 21 May 1971, SankarDa is still alive and is living under cover in the city Siddhartha announces that he will telecast Anirban's Suicide LIVE on television, which in turn has plummeted the commercial value of his channel.

Cast
Mithun Chakraborty as Anirban Sen
Dhritiman Chatterjee as Siddhartha Chowdhury (Owner of a News Channel)
Gargi Roychowdhury as Reena Sen
Shankar Chakraborty as minister Arijit Mitra
Nishita Goswami
Kapil Bora as Rohoni sen
Kanchana Moitra

References

External links

Official trailer on YouTube
Official Facebook Page on Facebook

2015 films
Films about Naxalism
Bengali-language Indian films
2010s Bengali-language films